Aaron Paul Morley (born 27 February 2000) is an English professional footballer who plays as a midfielder for EFL League One side Bolton Wanderers.

Playing career

Youth career
Morley started his career in the academy of Manchester City and then later, the academy of Bolton Wanderers, before signing for the academy of Rochdale.

Rochdale
After progressing through Rochdale's academy he first featured for the senior team during the 2016-17 pre-season campaign. After being named as an unused substitute regularly in League One, Morley made his competitive debut in a 2–1 EFL Trophy victory over Notts County on 4 October 2016.

He made his league debut four days later in a 3–0 win over Southend United. Morley also had a five-minute cameo in Rochdale's 2-0 FA Cup victory over Maidstone United, playing as a left-winger rather than his preferred central role.

Morley made a further three appearances for the club during the season – in two EFL Trophy matches and one league fixture.

On 1 March 2017, he signed his first professional contract with the club following his 17th birthday.

He was offered a new contract by Rochdale at the end of the 2018–19 season.

On 28 June 2019, Morley signed a new three-year contract with Rochdale.

Bolton Wanderers
On 11 January 2022, it was announced Morley had re-signed for Bolton Wanderers, having previously played in the Bolton Wanderers academy as a child, and signed a three and a half year contract with EFL League One team. He signed for an undisclosed fee which reported by The Bolton News to be around £100,000. He made his debut on 15 January in a 2-0 home win against Ipswich Town.

Career statistics

References

2000 births
Living people
English footballers
Association football midfielders
Manchester City F.C. players
Bolton Wanderers F.C. players
Rochdale A.F.C. players
English Football League players